The 1902 Furman Baptists football team represented Furman University during the 1902 Southern Intercollegiate Athletic Association football season. Led by Charles Roller in his second and final season as head coach, Furman compiled an overall record of 4–3–4 with a mark of 0–2–1 in SIAA play. The Atlanta Constitution rated fullback A. T. Sublett All-Southern.

Schedule

References

Furman
Furman Paladins football seasons
Furman Baptists football